Forelius mccooki is a species of ant in the genus Forelius. Described by McCook in 1880, the species is endemic to the United States and Mexico, where they nest in soil surrounded by a typically small mound, and also nests under stones.

References

External links

Dolichoderinae
Hymenoptera of North America
Insects described in 1880